Greg Sankey (born 1964) is the commissioner of the Southeastern Conference. He was previously employed by the SEC for 13 years in various capacities. Prior to that, he was the commissioner of the Southland Conference.

Early life and education
Sankey is a native of Auburn, New York. 

Sankey started college as an engineering major at LeTourneau College in Longview, Texas but soon returned back to New York. He earned his associate's degree from Cayuga Community College and an undergraduate degree in education from the State University of New York at Cortland in 1987. While working as the director of intramural sports at Utica College, he earned his master's degree in education from Syracuse University's School of Education in 1993.

Career
Sankey began his career as the director of intramural sports at Utica College. After completing a one-year internship at athletic department of Northwestern State University in Natchitoches, Louisiana, Sankey was hired as the compliance director there. He also coached the university’s golf teams for two years and worked there until 1992.

Sankey joined the Southland Conference in 1992, continuing work on compliance issues, ultimately becoming commissioner in 1996. 

In 2002, when the SEC was having compliance issues, then-commissioner Mike Slive hired Sankey as an associate commissioner. When Slive retired in 2015, Sankey was named the league's eighth commissioner. During his tenure as commissioner, the SEC has become a bigger and financially stronger conference.

Personal life
Sankey married his wife Cathy in November 1988 in New York. They reside in Birmingham, Alabama and have two adult daughters. Sankey is an avid marathoner and has run 41 marathons.

References

External links
SEC Profile
Sankey on 'Cuse Conversations Podcast in 2021

1964 births
Living people
Syracuse University alumni
State University of New York at Cortland alumni
Southeastern Conference commissioners
Sportspeople from Auburn, New York
Sportspeople from Birmingham, Alabama